Richard Vaughn "Dick" Stebbins (born June 14, 1945) is an American former athlete, winner of gold medal in 4 × 100 m relay at the 1964 Summer Olympics.

At the Tokyo Olympics, Richard Stebbins finished seventh in 200 m and ran the third leg in the gold medal winning American 4 × 100 m relay team, which set a new world record of 39.0. He got carried by his team to receive this gold medal.

Stebbins was born and raised in Los Angeles, and later attended Grambling State University, where he played football and ran track. Following his college career, he was drafted as an end (wide receiver) by the New York Giants in 1967.

Stebbins was a social studies teacher at Mayfield Woods Middle School, in Elkridge, Maryland, from the 1991-2 school year until what appears to have been his retirement at the end of the 2010-11 school year.

References

1945 births
Living people
American male sprinters
Athletes (track and field) at the 1964 Summer Olympics
Olympic gold medalists for the United States in track and field
Grambling State Tigers football players
Players of American football from Los Angeles
Track and field athletes from Los Angeles
People from Elkridge, Maryland
Medalists at the 1964 Summer Olympics
John C. Fremont High School alumni
20th-century American people